Ekaterina Voronina is a 1957 Soviet drama film directed by Isidor Annensky.

Plot
Katya Voronina, devoid of maternal upbringing, grew into an uncompromising girl. At the beginning of the war, she voluntarily went to work at the hospital. After the war, she received an education and became an engineer and the head of the river port, but she did not have a relationship with the head of the shipping company. And so, he is fired, and Katya realizes that he was her closest person.

Cast
Lyudmila Khityaeva as Ekaterina Voronina
Sergey Bobrov as Voronin  
Vera Pashennaya as Grandmother  
Nadir Malishevsky as Lednyov  
Ariadna Shengelaya as Irina  
Vadim Medvedev as Mostovoy
Mikhail Ulyanov as Sutyrin
Nonna Mordyukova as Dusya Oshurkova
Aleksandr Sashin-Nikolsky as Yevgeni Samojlovich
Yury Puzyryov as Zhenya Kulagin  
Yury Kireev as Nikolay
Ye. Kudryavtseva as Klara
 Ivan Kuznetsov as Maksim Petrovich  
Irina Murzaeva as Kaleria Ivanovna

Release
Isidor Annensky's film was watched by 27.8 million Soviet viewers, which is 473 results for the entire history of Soviet cinematography.

References

External links
 

1957 films
1950s Russian-language films
Russian drama films
1957 drama films
Films set in Nizhny Novgorod
Films shot in Nizhny Novgorod
Gorky Film Studio films